Frank Hudec was a drummer who was part of the Stan Seltzer Trio. He recorded on Decca Records. He was born in Cicero, Illinois and studied with Frank Pechl and played with Al Hirt.

Stan Seltzer Trio
Stan Seltzer, piano
Red Mitchell, bass
Frank Hudec, drums

Discography
Our Man in New Orleans
Al Hirt, trumpet
Frank Hudec, drums
Al Hirt at the Mardi Gras (1962)
Al Hirt, trumpet
Frank Hudec, drums

References

American jazz drummers